Andrew Erickson (born May 5, 1976) is an American biathlete. He competed in the men's relay event at the 1998 Winter Olympics.

References

External links
 

1976 births
Living people
American male biathletes
Olympic biathletes of the United States
Biathletes at the 1998 Winter Olympics
People from Minnetonka, Minnesota